Telenominae is a subfamily of Hymenoptera in the family Platygastridae.

The subfamilies Scelioninae, Teleasinae, and Telenominae were formerly in the family Scelionidae, but Scelionidae was combined with the family Platygastridae because of genetic similarities. The name Platygastridae was retained for the resulting family because of seniority.

Genera
These genera belong to the subfamily Telenominae:
Eumicrosoma Gahan 1913
Nirupana Nixon 1935
Paratelenomous Dodd, 1914
Phanuromyia Dodd 1914
Protelenomus Kieffer, 1906
Psix Kozlov, 1976
Telenomus Haliday, 1833
Trissolcus Ashmead, 1893

References

Further reading

 
 
 

Parasitic wasps
Apocrita subfamilies
Platygastridae